The Aiguille d'Argentière is a mountain in the Mont Blanc massif on the border between France and Switzerland.

The first ascent of the mountain was by a British party comprising Edward Whymper and A. Reilly with guides Michel Croz, M. Payot, H. Charlet on 15 July 1864. The route they took was via the west flank and the north-west ridge.

See also

 Argentière
 List of mountains of the Alps above 3000 m
 List of mountains of Switzerland

References

External links

The Aiguille d'Argentière on SummitPost
The Aiguille d'Argentière on Hikr

Mountains of the Graian Alps
Alpine three-thousanders
Mountains of Valais
France–Switzerland border
International mountains of Europe
Mountains of Haute-Savoie
Mountains of Switzerland
Three-thousanders of Switzerland
Mont Blanc massif